Nairi SC, is a defunct Armenian football club from the capital Yerevan. The club was dissolved in 2000 and is no longer active in professional football.

League record

References

External links
 RSSSF Armenia (and subpages per year)

Nairi Yerevan
Association football clubs established in 1954
Association football clubs disestablished in 2000
1954 establishments in Armenia
2000 disestablishments in Armenia